Brain damage is the destruction or degeneration of brain cells.

Brain damage or Brain Damage may also refer to:

Film and TV
 Brain Damage (film), a 1988 comedy horror film by Frank Henenlotter
 Brain Damage Films, an Arizona-based horror film distributor and production company

Music
 Brain Damage (band), a French psychedelic rock band formed in 1977
 Brain Damage, an album by Vendetta

Songs
 "Brain Damage" (song), a song by Pink Floyd from The Dark Side of the Moon
 "Brain Damage" (Eminem song), a 1999 song from The Slim Shady LP
 "Brain Damage", a song by Fist (band)	1980
 "Brain Damage", a song by The Radiators (Australian band)	1981
 "Brain Damage", a song by Brewer and Shipley	1975

Other uses
 Brain injury, any injury occurring in the brain of a living organism
 Brain Damage (wrestler) or Marvin Lambert (1977–2012), American professional wrestler 
 Brain Damage (comics), a British adult comic that was published monthly from 1989 to 1992

See also
 Brian Damage or Brian Keats (1963–2010), punk rock drummer